The following lists events that happened during 2016 in Syria.

Incumbents
 President: Bashar al-Assad
 Prime Minister: Wael Nader al-Halqi (until 3 July), Imad Khamis (starting 3 July)

Events
For events related to the Civil War, see Timeline of the Syrian Civil War (January–April 2016), Timeline of the Syrian Civil War (May–August 2016) and Timeline of the Syrian Civil War (September–December 2016)

Public holidays

See also

 Timeline of Syrian history

References

 
Syria
Years of the 21st century in Syria
2010s in Syria
Syria